Magda Maros (born 4 November 1951) is a Hungarian fencer who won three Olympic medals in the foil competitions.

She was named Hungarian Sportswoman of The Year in 1980 after having won two Olympic medals the same year.

References

1951 births
Living people
Hungarian female foil fencers
Fencers at the 1976 Summer Olympics
Fencers at the 1980 Summer Olympics
Olympic fencers of Hungary
Olympic silver medalists for Hungary
Olympic bronze medalists for Hungary
Olympic medalists in fencing
Fencers from Budapest
Medalists at the 1976 Summer Olympics
Medalists at the 1980 Summer Olympics
20th-century Hungarian women